Joe Scarborough (born 1938) is an English artist. He is known for painting humorous scenes of Sheffield life, and everyday "real" images of the life and people of South Yorkshire.

Early life and education
Scarborough was born in Pitsmoor, Sheffield, in 1938. His father was a foreman in a steelworks, and Scarborough says he was "breast-fed on socialism and the great move forward".

He went to Marlcliffe School in Sheffield, which existed between 1915 and 1964, until the age of 16.

Working life
After leaving school, Scarborough began work as a laboratory assistant at the Batchelors processed food company.  

He then became a face worker at the colliery at Thorpe Hesley, and was inspired to paint by the contrast of the darkness of the mines and the lightness of the real world above the ground. 

In 1968 disenchantment with the pits led to numerous jobs - labourer, municipal park gardener and a dishwasher for some years, nurturing a dream to be a full-time painter. For years he pushed a handcart, packed with paintings round all his local pubs selling what he could in almost folkloric-like tradition, becoming at times like the characters he went on to portray in later scenes. He started by painting ships, but they did not sell, and then started painting buildings, which were more successful.

Works

The Register of Naive Artists gave Scarborough his works their first showing, in London, but they received a scathing review in The Guardian, and he returned to Sheffield.

Scarborough's first one-man show lasted for two years at the Attic Cafe near Sheffield's main bus station. One-man and mixed exhibitions followed which took the everyday scenes of Yorkshire life from Sheffield to Rotherham to London to San Francisco to Chicago and back to Sheffield.

Scarborough's paintings now appear in several major collections and numerous works have been imprinted.

Sixteen of his paintings are in Sheffield public art collections, for example Sheffield Museums and Sheffield Hallam University. This includes his largest work "Sheffield Through the Ages" which is 30 feet by 8 feet in the Weston Park Museum.

Recognition

In 2008 he was commemorated as one of the Sheffield Legends with a star on the 'Walk of Fame' outside Sheffield Town Hall.

Personal life
Scarborough was married: his wife, Audrey, was born in Alberta, Canada. She died in 2002 and he moved to live in a narrowboat on Victoria Quays in Sheffield, where he still lives .

He suffered a suspected heart attack in November 2021 but recovered fully.

References

External links

1938 births
Living people
20th-century English painters
English male painters
Artists from Sheffield
21st-century English painters
20th-century English male artists
21st-century English male artists